Sandra Völker (born 1 April 1974) is a retired freestyle and backstroke swimmer from Germany, who won a total number of three (one silver, two bronze) medals at the 1996 Summer Olympics in Atlanta, United States. There she made her second Olympic appearance. Völker competed in four Olympics, making her debut in Barcelona, Spain in 1992.

See also 
 World record progression 50 metres backstroke

References 
 Personal homepage
 Profile on FINA-website
 

1974 births
Living people
Sportspeople from Lübeck
German female swimmers
German female backstroke swimmers
German female freestyle swimmers
Olympic swimmers of Germany
Swimmers at the 1992 Summer Olympics
Swimmers at the 1996 Summer Olympics
Swimmers at the 2000 Summer Olympics
Swimmers at the 2004 Summer Olympics
Olympic silver medalists for Germany
Olympic bronze medalists for Germany
World record setters in swimming
Olympic bronze medalists in swimming
German female butterfly swimmers
World Aquatics Championships medalists in swimming
Medalists at the FINA World Swimming Championships (25 m)
European Aquatics Championships medalists in swimming
Medalists at the 1996 Summer Olympics
Olympic silver medalists in swimming
21st-century German women
20th-century German women